Eugene Pao is a jazz guitarist. He has played with Jeremy Monteiro's group Asiana.

References

External links
 Official website

Living people
Hong Kong jazz guitarists
Year of birth missing (living people)
Place of birth missing (living people)